Ponmudy is a 1982 Indian Malayalam-language film, directed and produced by N. Sankaran Nair. The film stars Prem Nazir, Sharada, Divya and Sankaradi. The film's score was composed by Jithin Shyam.

Cast

Prem Nazir as Divakaran
Sharada as Madhavi
Sankaradi as Keshavan
Raghavan as Gopi
Kuttyedathi Vilasini as Radhamma
Meena as Karthu
Mohan as Raju
Nellikode Bhaskaran as Bhaskaran
Paravana Abdulrahman
Sharmila as Vidhu
Divya
Kallara Sasi

Soundtrack
The music was composed by Jithin Shyam with lyrics by Balu Kiriyath and Perumpuzha Gopalakrishnan.

References

External links
 

1982 films
1980s Malayalam-language films